Mister Big is a 1943 musical directed by Charles Lamont, starring Donald O'Connor, Gloria Jean and Peggy Ryan. The film features the song "Rude, Crude, and Unattractive".

This was the final of seven, successive B movie musicals that Universal Pictures cast with Donald O’Connor after he signed in 1941. When his popularity soared prior to release, the studio added $50,000 in musical numbers and distributed it as an A.   His subsequent films were all A's.

Plot 

Based on the life of a Russian man named Herman, the film takes place in a school for the dramatic arts called the Davis School of the Theatre, run by Jeremy Taswell, Donald (Donald O'Connor) has written a musical comedy for the school play.  But the owner of the school, Mrs. Davis (Florence Bates) (whose niece, played by Gloria Jean, secretly has a crush on Donald), disapproves and insists that they do a play by Sophocles instead. The students manage to change the play into a musical while Mrs. Davis is traveling to New York. Their triumph is short lived, however, for Mrs. Davis comes back from New York on opening night. At first she becomes quite angry at the students, but changes her tune when a Broadway producer agrees to finance the show and produce it in New York.

Cast
Gloria Jean- Patricia
Donald O'Connor- Donald
Peggy Ryan- Peggy
Robert Paige- Johnny Hanley
Elyse Knox- Alice Taswell
Samuel S. Hinds- Jeremy Taswell
Florence Bates- Mrs. Mary Davis
Mary Eleanor Donahue- Muggsy

Production
The film was known as School for Jive. This was changed to Mister Big in April 1943. Donald O'Connor was promoted to star billing for the film following the positive reception he had received at previews.

Songs
Serenade (Joy) performed by Gloria Jean
Soliloquy performed by Donald O'Connor and chorus
This Must Be a Dream performed by Ray Eberle
Niagara performed by the Jivin' Jacks and Jills, featuring Donald O'Connor and Peggy Ryan
Moonlight and Roses performed by Gloria Jean
All the Things I Wanta Say performed by Donald O'Connor and Peggy Ryan
Kitten with My Mittens Laced performed by the Jivin' Jacks and Jills
Rude, Crude, and Unattractive performed by Donald O'Connor, Peggy Ryan, and the Jivin' Jacks and Jills
We're Not Obvious performed by Donald O'Connor and Gloria Jean
Thee and Me performed by Donald O'Connor, Peggy Ryan, and Gloria Jean
Come Along, My Mandy performed by Donald O'Connor and Peggy Ryan, sung by the Ben Carter Choir
We'll Meet Again performed by the Ben Carter Choir
Russian Boogie (The Herman Song) performed by the Jivin' Jacks and Jills
Hi, Character performed by Donald O'Connor and Peggy Ryan
The Spirit Is in Me sung by Gloria Jean, performed by the Jivin' Jacks and Jills, featuring Peggy Ryan

References

External links 
 
 

1943 films
1943 musical films
Films directed by Charles Lamont
American black-and-white films
Universal Pictures films
American musical films
1940s American films